Craig Russell "Russ" Yeast II (born May 8, 1999) is an American football safety for the Los Angeles Rams of the National Football League (NFL). He played college football at Louisville and Kansas State.

College career
Yeast played college football at Louisville from 2017–2020 before transferring to Kansas State for the 2021 season.

Professional career
Yeast was drafted in the seventh round with the 253rd pick of the seventh round of the 2022 NFL Draft.

References

External links
 Los Angeles Rams bio
 Louisville Cardinals bio
 Kansas State Wildcats bio

Living people
1999 births
Players of American football from Kentucky
American football safeties
Louisville Cardinals football players
Kansas State Wildcats football players
Los Angeles Rams players
People from Danville, Kentucky